The Hawks and the Sparrows (literally "Birds of prey and Little Birds") is a 1966 Italian film directed by Pier Paolo Pasolini. It was entered into the 1966 Cannes Film Festival where a "Special Mention" was made of Totò, for his acting performance.

The film can be described as partially neorealist, and deals with Marxist concerns about poverty and class-conflict. It features the popular Italian comic-actor Totò accompanied on a journey by his son (played by Ninetto Davoli). This is the last film to star Totò before his untimely death of a heart attack in 1967.

Plot

Totò and his son Ninetto roam the neighbourhood and the countryside of Rome. During the walk they observe a body being removed from a house following a murder. They next encounter a talking crow, who is described in the intertitles thus: "For the benefit of those who were not paying attention or are in doubt, we remind you that the Crow is – as you say – a left-wing intellectual of the kind found living before Palmiro Togliatti's death").

The Crow subsequently recounts the tale of "Fra Ciccillo" and "Fra Ninetto" (still played by Totò and Ninetto), two Franciscan friars, who are bid by St. Francis to preach the Gospel to the hawks (representing the powerful) and the sparrows (representing the weak). After many failures they discover the language of birds and succeed in preaching the commandment of love unto the species separately, but are not able to get them to love each other. The hawks continue to kill and eat the sparrows, as it is in their nature. Saint Francis explains the relationship between the two groups to them from a Marxist perspective and invites them to continue proselytizing.

After the tale, the journey of Totò and Ninetto carries on, the Crow still accompanying them. They encounter other individuals: land-owners who order them off their land when they are caught defecating; a family living in absolute poverty with no food and whom Totò threatens to drive out of the house if the rent is not paid; a group of travelling actors (representing figures marginalised from society such as women, gays, the elderly, racial minorities, and the disabled) and who persuade the pair to push the group's Cadillac car for them; and a rich man who is waiting for Totò to give him the money he owes him (in contrast to the earlier episode where Toto had demanded rent). This is followed by news footage of the funeral of Palmiro Togliatti, the long-time leader of the Italian Communist Party. Finally, after having met a prostitute, the two end up killing and eating the Crow, whom they found to be unconscionably boring.

Pasolini declared that Uccellacci e uccellini was his favourite film, as it was the only one that did not disappoint his expectations.

Ennio Morricone's opening theme music features Domenico Modugno singing the movie's credits.

Cast
 Totò – Innocenti Totò / Brother Ciccillo
 Ninetto Davoli – Innocenti Ninetto / Brother Ninetto (as Davoli Ninetto)
 Femi Benussi – Luna, the prostitute
 Francesco Leonetti – The Crow (voice)
 Gabriele Baldini – The engineer
 Riccardo Redi – The dentist dantist
 Lena Lin Solaro – Urganda, the unknown
 Rossana di Rocco – Friend of Ninetto
 Umberto Bevilacqua – Incensurato
 Renato Capogna – The medieval rude fellow
 Vittorio Vittori – Ciro Lococo
 Renato Montalbano

Production
Filming took place in Assisi, Tuscania, Viterbo, Rome and at Leonardo da Vinci–Fiumicino Airport. Interior sets from Incir De Paolis Studios'' were also used.

Pasolini chose to cast Totò as the protagonist as he felt his comedic style represented the two aspects of humanity: extravagance and humanity. Pasolini chose to use both non-professional actors from off the streets and Italian cinematic icons like Totò because he felt the brutality of the amateur and the lightness of the professional worked together.

Totò was used to choosing his own jokes and ad-libbing his own lines but for this film he learned to respect Pasolini's script and direction.

Carlo Croccolo offered to dub Totò for Pasolini as he worked on the dubbing for many of Totò's other films but Pasolini refused this.

Scenes had to frequently be reshot as the crow kept trying to claw at Totò's eyes. Thus a system was devised where the crow's cage was placed behind the camera and the crow would chase after it.

Reception
The film had great critical success but the commercial success was very weak. This is the lowest grossing film to star Totò.

Due to the film's success among Italian critics it has made it on to the list of "100 Italian films to be saved" and is on the 1,000 greatest films of all time list of "They Shoot Pictures Don't They".

References

External links
Card english version + videoclip "Uccellacci e uccellini

1966 films
Films directed by Pier Paolo Pasolini
1966 comedy films
Italian comedy films
Italian satirical films
Films set in Rome
Italian political satire films
Films shot in Rome
Films shot in Italy
Films scored by Ennio Morricone
1960s Italian-language films
1960s Italian films